Valentín Barco (born 23 July 2004) is an Argentine footballer currently playing as a left-back for Boca Juniors. He was included in The Guardian's "Next Generation" list for 2021.

Club career
Born in Buenos Aires, Barco started his career with Sportivo Las Parejas at the age of three. Six years later, he was scouted and immediately signed by Argentine giants Boca Juniors.

Career statistics

Club

References

2004 births
Living people
Footballers from Buenos Aires
Argentine footballers
Argentina youth international footballers
Association football defenders
Argentine Primera División players
Sportivo Las Parejas footballers
Boca Juniors footballers